Sajjad Ali (born 1966) is a Pakistani semi-classical, pop and rock singer, poet, actor, film director as well as a film producer from Karachi, Pakistan.

Early life and education 
His father, Shafqat Hussain (Sajan), was a Pakistani film actor and also a cricketer.  his father appeared for the first time in a film, Badal Aur Bijli in 1971. Sajjad completed his F.A degree from National Arts College, Karachi. After that, his uncle, Tassaduq Hussain started teaching music to him with his classical collections.  During Sajjad's training, Hussain played music from classical artists such as Ustad Ghulam Ali Khan, Ustad Barkat Ali Khan and Ustad Mubarak Ali Khan who all were Sajjad Ali's grand-uncles also. He was also briefly trained by his uncle Ustad Munawar Ali Khan from India who himself was the son of Ustad Ghulam Ali Khan. Sajjad Ali belongs to the Kasur Patiala Gharana of classical musicians.

Career

Music
Sajjad Ali's first classical hit album, Master Sajjad Sings Memorable Classics was released in 1979 by EMI-Pakistan. The musicians were Ustad Ghulam Ali (singer), Mehdi Hassan, Ghulam Ali and Amanat Ali Khan, while most of the songs were written by Hasrat Mohani, Momin and others.

Sajjad made his television debut in many programs before his debut program, Aap Janab by Athar Shah Khan. After this, he appeared in Rung Barangi Duniya by musician Sohail Rana. He also performed in the program Rag Rung in 1980 at the age of 14. He became famous at the 25th anniversary of PTV's stage show, called Silver Jubilee by Shoaib Mansoor, by singing the song "Banwari Chakori", originally sung by Noor Jehan. On 26 November 1983 during a show, Sajjad sung the songs "Lagi Ray Lagay Lagan Yehe Dil Mein" and "Bawari Chakuri".

He produced the music albums Babia 93, Chief Saab and  Sohni Lag Di.

 His brother Waqar Ali is also in the music industry. Sajjad, along with his brother, wrote lyrics for most of the songs in his albums, while lyricists Sabir Zafar, Mohammad Nasir, Nadeem Asad, and Ali Moin have also written some songs.

In July 2006, Sajjad released a single called "Chal Rein De", a more classical song. On 3 September 2006, he released another single in a totally different genre with the help of Meloscience Corp. The song is known as "Sajjad-Ali Sinsym Fligh", and it has an experimental, jazzy, Sufi beat. In late April 2008, Sajjad released his album, Chahar Balish, which contained new tracks as well as some previous tracks such as "Chal Rein De".

Two new compositions of Sajjad Ali from the film Bol by Shoaib Mansoor were released by Tips music on 22 May 2011 in India and on 30 May 2011 by Fire Records in Pakistan. He also appeared in the second episode of Coke Studio with his song "Kir Kir", which was broadcast on major television channels across Pakistan on 5 June 2011.

In 2017, Sajjad released his single with Bohemia (rapper) (Tamasha), a massive hit on YouTube and social media. It was his first collaboration.

Films and television 
Sajjad directed his first telefilm, Love Letter in 1989, and then his first full-length motion picture, Aik Aur Love Story in 1998. Before that, he also performed as an actor and a singer in a film,  Munda Tera Deewana which was directed by Zahoor Husain Gillani. Sajjad has also sung songs for drama serials, Teri Yaad (Album) in the PTV drama serial Thori Khushi Thora Ghum, "Na Boloon Gi" in Na Tum Jano Na Hum Janain (ARY Digital) and "Sunn Leyna" in Sunn Leyna (ARY Digital). His brother Waqar Ali is also credited with the making of these songs.

Sajjad composed songs in Shoaib Mansoor's 2011 film Bol. Sajjad stated that the songs were recorded in his own studio in Dubai and by the name of Din Pareshan hai, having two versions. According to Sajjad Ali this song is different from the song in his album Chahar Balish which has also the same title.

Critical acclaim 
Musician A. R. Rahman has described Sajjad as the original crossover:
"From the realm of the classical, he metamorphosed into one of the brightest lights of Pakistani pop. Always striking the right note, and never missing a beat, even the most hardened purist has to give Sajjad his due. This man can breathe life in a Ghazal even as he puts the V back into verve. He is one of the very few singers in Pakistan who seems a complete singer. As far as skill is concerned I feel nobody compares to Sajjad Ali. He is simply too good at everything he chooses to create."

Personal life 
Sajjad married his uncle's daughter Naureen in 1990. They have four children; two sons and two daughters. He lives in Dubai Marina, United Arab Emirates with his family, where he has been based for many years. 

His son Khubi Ali launched his professional music career in 2021 with the single Udaas, a rendition of Sajjad’s 2005 track. His other son Shabi Ali is a musician as well.

His two brothers, Waqar Ali and Lucky Ali, have also made a name in the Pakistan music industry.

Discography

Albums

Singles 
 "Babia"
 "Chal Urrja"
 "Kuch Larrkiyan Mujhe"
 "Chief Saab"
 "Mahiwal"
 "Tasvirain"
 "Jadoo"
 "Abhi Mood Nahi Hai"
 "Jhullay Lal"
 "Chal Jhooti"
 "Pyar Hai"

 "Charsi Hon Mai"

 "Lari Adda"
 "Pata Bata do"
 "Paniyon Mein"
 "Sohni Lag Di"
 "Cinderella"
 "Teri Yaad"
 "Aisa Laga"
 "Koi Nahin"
 "Cheti Cheti"
 "Na Boloon Gi (Rangeen)"
 "Chal Rein De" (July 2006)
 "Pekar" (2008)
 "Din Pareshan Hai" (2011)
 "KirKir KirKir" (2011)
 "Rung Laga feat Sanam Marvi (Duet)" (2011)
 "Qeemay Aalay Pooray" (2012)
 "Har Zulm Tera Yaad Hay"
 "Tasveer Bana Ke"
 "Bhoola Naa Ye Dil" for Meri Beti (2013)
 "Yaad Tu Ati Hogi"
 "Tum Naraz Ho"
 "Na Tum Samjhe" (2015)
 "Naakhun" (2016)
 "Tamasha", Sajjad Ali ft Bohemia (2017)
 "Lagaya Dil (2018)"
 "Bhejo Darood o Salam" (2019)
 "RAVI"(2019)
"Barish"(2020)
"DOST" (2020)
 " SANWAR DE " (2021)
 " INTEZAR " Official Audio (2021)
 "QARAR " (2022)
 "Aatish " (2022)

Filmography

As composer
 Love Letter (1990)
 Aik Aur Love Story (1999)
 Mujhe Chand Chahiye (2000)
 Bol (2011)
 Na Maloom Afraad (2014)

As director
 Love Letter(1989)
 Aik Aur Love Story (1999)

As actor
 Love Letter (1989)
 Munda Tera Deewana (1996)
 Aik Aur Love Story (1999)

See also 
 List of Lollywood actors

References

External links 
 

1966 births
Living people
Punjabi people
Pakistani male film actors
Pakistani expatriates in the United Arab Emirates
Pakistani film directors
Pakistani film producers
Urdu film producers
Pakistani poets
Pakistani child singers
Pakistani playback singers
Pakistani pop singers
Punjabi singers
Punjabi-language singers
University of Karachi alumni
Singers from Karachi
Nigar Award winners
Male actors from Karachi
Coke Studio (Pakistani TV program)
Patiala gharana
Recipients of Sitara-i-Imtiaz